3α-Etiocholanediol, or simply etiocholanediol, also known as 3α,5β-androstanediol or as etiocholane-3α,17β-diol, is a naturally occurring etiocholane (5β-androstane) steroid and an endogenous metabolite of testosterone. It is formed from 5β-dihydrotestosterone (after 5β-reduction of testosterone) and is further transformed into etiocholanolone.

See also
 3β-Etiocholanediol
 3α-Androstanediol
 3β-Androstanediol

References

External links
 Metabocard for Etiocholanediol (HMDB00551) - Human Metabolome Database

Diols
Etiocholanes
Human metabolites